KVMX (890 AM) is an Olivehurst, California, Class B radio station operating with 10,000 watts of power during the day and 270 watts at night from separate day and night transmitter sites. The station is owned by Lotus Communications through licensee Lotus Sacramento Corp. and targets the Sacramento area.

The station signed on in the summer of 2014, carrying programming from sister FM station KMJE-FM. It also broadcasts via translator K284CM on 104.7 MHz, licensed to Sacramento.

On June 30, 2016, the then-KMJE was granted an FCC construction permit to move the night transmitter site to the day transmitter site at KTKZ and decrease night power to 270 watts. The station changed its call sign to the current KVMX on April 17, 2017.

890 AM is United States clear-channel frequency.  KVMX must reduce nighttime power to 270 watts to prevent interference to the skywave signal of WLS in Chicago, Illinois, a Class A station.

References

External links

VMX
Radio stations established in 2014
Lotus Communications stations
2014 establishments in California